This article contains cast and character information of the TV5 political drama  Sa Ngalan ng Ina. It was the premiere offering of TV5 Mini Serye that is set to air only for a month.

Main cast

Elena Deogracias 
Governor Elena Toribio Vda. de Deogracias (Nora Aunor) She is the second wife of Dr. Armando "Amang" Deogracias, who is the mayor of the town of Salvacion. Before the Miting de Avance, she had a dream about her husband in fear that he might be in danger in his candidacy for the governorship. During the political rally, Amang was assassinated by a grenade explosion killing him instantly. She is being disowned by her eldest stepdaughter Andrea Deogracias, but loved by her youngest stepson Angelo. She is being supported by her younger sister Pacita and her niece Elsa. She was pick by the Partido Obrero (Worker's Party) to be the candidate for governorship of the Province of Verano. She would also have to choose between her people and her children.

Pepe Ilustre 
Governor Jose "Pepe" Ilustre (Christopher De Leon) The current governor of the province of Verano who is a paraplegic. The people took the blame on Pepe for the murder of Amang. He is being lured by his wife Lucia in winning the elections. He had a past with Elena before he married Lucia.

Supporting cast

Zaldy Sanchez 
Zaldy Sanchez (Ian De Leon) The loyal personal security of Amang. He is also loyal to Elena and to her stepchildren. Little did they know is that, he is having an affair with Lucia Ilustre.

Lucia Ilustre 
Lucia Ilustre (Rosanna Roces) The greedy and manipulative wife of Pepe. She is doing everything she wants for her husband to keep in power. But, she is having an affair with Zaldy, who is the personal bodyguard of Amang.

Andrea Deogracias 
Attorney Andrea Deogracias (Nadine Samonte) The eldest daughter of Amang and stepdaughter of Elena. She is the municipal  mayor of Salvacion. She dislikes Elena very much especially when Amang died. Andrea thinks that Elena wants to be inherited by Amang. She is engaged to Ramoncito Concepcion, but find more time in politics than her love to Ramoncito.

Alfonso Deogracias 
Alfonso Deogracias (Alwyn Uytingco) The second child of Amang and stepson of Elena. He is always involved in drugs and violence. He became more rebellious upon the death of Amang. He is always being arrested for the violence that he did. He will do everything he had to seek justice for his father's death.

Angelo Deogracias 
Police Inspector Angelo Deogracias (Edgar Allan Guzman) The youngest child of Amang and stepson of Elena who is a policeman. Among the stepchildren of Elena, he is really close to Elena. He is also the boyfriend of Carmela, although their families are in dispute.

Elsa Toribio 
Elsa Toribio (Eula Caballero) The daughter of Pacita and is a juvenile diabetic. Along with Pacita, they were adopted by Amang and treated them as a family.

Carmela Ilustre 
Carmela Iluste (Karel Marquez) The only daughter of Pepe and Lucia. She doesn't know everything about the dispute of her family with the Deogracias. Although there are dispute with the two families, she had time with her boyfriend Angelo.

Pacita Toribio 
Pacita Toribio (Eugene Domingo) The younger sister of Elena and Elsa's mother. She works for Elena and became confidant.

Ramoncito Concepcion 
Ramoncito Concepcion (Joross Gamboa) Andrea's fiancee. They are set to be married, but, upon the death of Amang, she had no time for Ramoncito, as she is more focus on her candidacy for mayor. He would try to convince Andrea to learn to accept Elena as her stepmother.

Manuel 
Manuel (Jay Aquitania) Pepe's personal secretary. He is always beside governor Pepe.

Extended

Dorinda Fernando 
Vice Governor Dorinda Fernando (Raquel Villavicencio) The Vice Governor of the province of Verano. She will also be Elena's adviser on her candidacy as Amang's replacement as the candidate of Partido Obrero.

Apo Lucas 
Apo Lucas (Leo Rialp) The leader of Partido Obrero. When Elena won as governor, he became the dictator of Elena.

Special Participation

Armando "Amang" Deogracias 
Dr. Armando "Amang" Deogracias (Bembol Roco) The mayor of Salvacion and wife of Elena. He is running for governor of the province. However, during a rally, a grenade was thrown on stage and exploded, killing him.

Lists of drama television characters
Lists of Philippine television series characters